Paul Nicholson may refer to:

Paul Nicholson (ice hockey) (1954–2011), Canadian ice hockey forward 
Paul Nicholson (darts player) (born 1979), English-born Australian darts player
Paul Nicholson (businessman) (born 1938), English industrialist and Lord Lieutenant of County Durham
Paul Nicholson (footballer) (born 1986), professional footballer